Coptic may refer to:

Afro-Asia
 Copts, an ethnoreligious group mainly in the area of modern Egypt but also in Sudan and Libya
 Coptic language, a Northern Afro-Asiatic language spoken in Egypt until at least the 17th century
 Coptic alphabet, the script used for writing the Coptic language, encoded in Unicode as:
 Greek and Coptic (Unicode block), a block of Unicode characters for writing the Coptic language, from which Coptic was disunified in Unicode 4.1
 Coptic (Unicode block), a block of Unicode characters for writing the Coptic language, introduced in Unicode 4.1
 Coptic Epact Numbers, a block of Unicode characters for writing Coptic numerals
 Coptic Orthodox Church of Alexandria or Coptic Church, the largest Christian church in Egypt and the Middle East
 Coptic Catholic Church, an Alexandrian Rite particular Church
 Coptic architecture, the architecture of the Copts
 Coptic binding or Coptic sewing, methods of bookbinding employed by early Christians in Egypt

Other uses
 SS Coptic (1881), a ship of the White Star Line
 Coptic Egypt: The Christians of the Nile, a 2000 nonfiction book written by Christian Cannuyer
 Coptic Encyclopedia, an eight-volume work covering all areas of knowledge of Coptic Egypt

See also
 Copic, a brand of refillable markers

Language and nationality disambiguation pages